Kvasov or Kvassov (feminine: Kvasova or Kvassova) is a Russian-language surname.

The surname may refer to:
Andrey Kvasov (c. 1720 – c. 1770), a notable Baroque architect who worked in Russia and Ukraine.
Andrey Kvassov (b. 1976), a Kazakh swimmer.
Sergei Kvasov (b. 1983), a Russian professional football player.
Yaroslav Kvasov, Ukrainian footballer.

Russian-language surnames